Erv or ERV may refer to:

People 
 Ervin (given name)
 Erv Brame (1901–1949), American baseball player
 Erv Dusak (1920–1994), American baseball player
 Erv Kanemoto (born 1943), American Grand Prix motorcycle mechanic and team owner
 Erv Kantlehner (1892–1990), American baseball player
 Erv Lange (1887–1971), American baseball player
 Erv Mondt (born 1938), American football coach
 Erv Palica (1928–1982), American baseball player
 Erv Pitts (1920–1999), American sports coach
 Erv Prasse (1917–2005), American multi-sport athlete
 Erv Staggs (1948–2012), American basketball player
 Erv Wilson (1928–2016), Mexican and American music theorist

Other uses 
 Easy-to-Read Version, a bible translation
 Emergency response vehicle
 Endogenous retrovirus
 Energy recovery ventilation
 English Revised Version, a bible translation
 Expiratory reserve volume
 Kerrville Municipal Airport, in Texas, United States
 Earth return vehicle, a spacecraft that forms a portion of the Mars Direct proposal